is a Japanese football player for Thai League 2 club Samut Prakan City.

Club statistics

References

External links

1985 births
Living people
Aoyama Gakuin University alumni
Association football people from Okinawa Prefecture
Japanese footballers
J2 League players
Sagan Tosu players
Sportivo Luqueño players
Clube Atlético Linense players
Sho Shimoji
Sho Shimoji
Japanese expatriate footballers
Japanese expatriate sportspeople in Paraguay
Expatriate footballers in Paraguay
Expatriate footballers in Brazil
Expatriate footballers in Thailand
Association football midfielders